GnRH2, also known as  gonadotropin-releasing hormone II or LHRH-II.  Its gene is located on human chromosome 20.

Most vertebrate species possess two or three forms of gonadotropin-releasing hormone (GnRH) expressed in three distinct brain regions. Although the function of the hypothalamic form (GnRH1; common to many vertebrates), in controlling the reproductive axis has been defined, the functions of the other two isoforms (GnRH2 and GnRH3) remain largely unknown. The presence and conservation of GnRH2 across vertebrate species indicate important biological roles, but the absence of GnRH2 in rodents has greatly hampered the use of these vertebrate models and modern molecular tools to pursue its functions.

A relatively well-documented function of GnRH2 is that the administration of GnRH2 has anorexigenic effects in female musk shrew, mouse, goldfish  and zebrafish, but the mechanisms are still unclear.

See also 
 Gonadotropin-releasing hormone (GnRH1)
 Gonadotropin-releasing hormone agonist
 Gonadotropin-releasing hormone antagonist

References 

Genes on human chromosome 20